Kokopu is a locality in Northland, New Zealand. Whangarei lies about 20 km to the east.

Education
Kokopu School is a coeducational full primary (years 1–8) school with a decile rating of 9 and a roll of 95. The school was established in 1914, and for the first twenty years it operated half-time, sharing its teacher with Kara School.

Notes

External links
Kokopu School website

Whangarei District
Populated places in the Northland Region